Dagger Paths is a 2010 studio EP by Forest Swords. It was released as an EP on 1 March 2010 by Olde English Spelling Bee and re-released later that year on November 22 by No Pain in Pop as the Dagger Paths EP (Expanded Edition), with two extra tracks from Rattling Cage 7" single and a bonus disc containing six early Forest Swords songs, four remixes by other artists, and a lengthy Forest Swords mix.

The six early Forest Swords songs found on the Dagger Paths EP (Expanded Edition) bonus disc were later officially released in 2011 as the Fjree Feather EP (in fact, they had first appeared on a 2009 self-released EP of the same name). Some digital versions of the Dagger Paths EP (Expanded Edition), such as that sold by Amazon.com, feature the EP's remastered and extra tracks, but do not include the bonus disc.

It was named album of the year by FACT Magazine  and Pitchfork Media placed it at number 48 on their "Top 50 Albums of 2010" list.

Track list

Dagger Paths
 Miarches 6:23
 Hoylake Misst 7:52
 Visits 3:31
 Glory Gongs 6:24
 If Your Girl 6:26
 The Light 3:29
 Rattling Cage 3:51  (only on No Pain in Pop re-release)
 Hjurt 4:10 (only on No Pain in Pop re-release)

No Pain in Pop bonus disc
 Down Steps 5:59
 Red Rocks Fogg 6:22
 Kaibasa Claps 6:07
 Trust Your Blood 6:15
 Riverbed 5:34
 Bones 5:27
 Rattling Cage [Becoming RealRemix] 3:45
 Miarches [Turnbull Green's Skywalker Og remix] 4:19
 Hjurt [Pariah Refix] 3:12
 Rattling Cage [Dro Carey 'Neon Hudrat' mix] 4:17
 Remixtape 23:27

References

2010 EPs
Forest Swords albums